A Fazenda 8 (in English: The Farm 8) is the eighth season of the Brazilian reality television series A Fazenda, which premiered September 23, 2015, on the Record television network. This season is part of a millionaire contract signed in 2011 between Strix Television and Rede Record which guaranteed the show's rights until 2019.

This season marks the debut of Roberto Justus hosting the show, replacing Britto Junior, who hosted the previous seven seasons. Gianne Albertoni returns as the show's social media correspondent on A Fazenda Online and events of sponsorship and bonuses are hosted by Bruna Calmon.
The grand prize for the winner is R$2 million without tax allowances, with a brand new car offered to the runner-up.

Twists

The teams
The teams Rabbit, Sheep and Ostrich (present on the seasons 3, 4, 6 and 7) became extinct and were replaced by two teams (Axe and Saw).

The stall
In this new season, the barn was replaced by the stall. Every week, three contestants will have to share space with the horses and sleep beside the animals.

Contestants
Below is biographical information according to the Record official site, plus footnoted additions.(ages stated are correct at the start of the contest)

Future appearances
In 2017, Ana Paula Minerato returned to compete in A Fazenda 9, she finished in 9th place in the competition.

In 2017, Carla Prata appeared in Dancing Brasil 2, she finished in 6th place in the competition.

In 2018, Douglas Sampaio appeared in Dancing Brasil 3, he finished in 10th place in the competition.

In 2018, Amaral appeared in Dancing Brasil 4, he finished in 4th place in the competition.

In 2019, Marcelo Bimbi appeared with his wife Nicole Bahls in Power Couple Brasil 4, they originally finished in 8th place, however they comeback to the game and finished as winners from the competition.

In 2021, JP Mantovani and Li Martins appeared as a couple in Power Couple Brasil 5, they finished in 3rd place in the competition.

In 2022, Amaral appeared as a Dog in The Masked Singer Brasil 2, he joined at the Group B third round as an wildcard, he sang three songs before his unmasking at the eighth episode, placing 9th in the competition.

The game

Obligations

Key power
Since season 5, contestants compete to win the Key Power each week. The Key Power holder is the only contestant who can open the mystery box located at the Farm. However, opening the box will unleash either a good consequence or a bad consequence at the nomination process.

This season, only two pre-selected contestants (one from each team) are allowed to compete each round. The winner becomes the Key Power holder for the week, while the loser is sent to the stall, along with two other contestants (one from each team) selected by the winner of the round. The Key Holder's choice is marked in bold.

Results

Instant choice
The Instant Choice continued on this season. During the designated/announced five-minute voting window, Twitter users (with public accounts only) may vote to select a contestant to receive a special opportunity not available to others (which may or may not influence directly in the game) by tweeting the option's keyword along with the show's designated hashtag.

Voting history

Notes

 :  Key Power holder Douglas opened the mystery box, which contained two envelopes. He was allowed to open the first envelope and revealed that he had to choose two contestants from his team and one from the other team to win an immunity. He gave immunities to Ovelha and Rayanne (Saw) and Carla (Axe). In the second envelope Douglas had to choose one contestant between the ones in the stall to have his nomination counted as two. He chose Luka, so his vote on Quelynah counted as two votes against her.
 :   Key Power holder JP opened the mystery box, which contained two envelopes. He was allowed to open the first envelope and revealed that he had to choose two contestants from his team to win an immunity. He chose Li and Quelynah. In the second envelope he had to choose to ban one contestant from his team to nominating. He banned Marcelo.
 : Veridiana got more votes by house and was nominated. She had to choose the third nominee between Ana Paula, Quelynah and Thiago, who were in the stall. She chose Thiago. However, Carla opened the second envelope that said she should replace the third nominee by another contestant of her choice. She decided to nominate Mara.
 : JP, the Key Power holder, opened the first envelope and had to banish five contestants from voting. He chose Ana Paula, Luka, Ovelha, Douglas and Rayanne.
 :  Key Power holder Marcelo opened the first envelope in the mystery box and had to immunize two contestants from the stall (Mara and Quelynah). According to the second envelope, the remaining eligible contestants were asked to save one contestant. Carla was the last one and became the third nominee for the week.
 :  Key Power holder Rayanne opened the first envelope in the mystery box and had to choose between immunize herself or immunize another contestant. She decided to immunize Mara. In the second envelope she was told that their vote was counted as two.
 :  Key Power holder Ana Paula opened the first envelope in the mystery box and had to choose between win an immunity and not to vote or not win an immunity and vote. She decided for the first option. In the second envelope she was told that her opponent in the Key Power would be automatically named, leaving Quelynah as the third nominee.
 : Key Power holder JP opened the mystery box, which contained two envelopes. In the first envelope, JP had to choose one contestant to have his nomination counted as two. He chose Marcelo, so his vote on Rayanne counted as two votes against her. After the vote, the three nominees were: Mara (by Farmer), Rayanne (by House) and Luka (by Stall). However, in the second envelope it was revealed that JP must replace one of them. He chose Carla to replace Luka as this week's nominees.
 :  The Saw team holds the Key Power, so each team member had their own envelope chosen by Key Power challenge winner Luka. Since there were only four envelopes for five members, Luka decided that Douglas wouldn't get an envelope. Before the vote take place, Luka won a place in the final after opening the 1st envelope. Rayanne opened the 2nd envelope and won a letter from home. The remaining twists would only be revealed after the vote.
 : Douglas and Mara received the most nominations with three each. Rayanne, as Farmer of the Week, had the casting vote and choose Mara to be the second nominee.
 : After the vote, Ana Paula opened the 3rd envelope and won R$30,000. Finally, Mara opened the 4th and final envelope, that asked her to ban one nominee (Ana Paula, Mara or Marcelo) from competing for the next Farmer. She banned Marcelo, so he is automatically up to the public vote.
 : Rayanne opened the first envelope and was informed that she could not be nominated by the farmer Ana Paula. After Ana Paula's vote, she was eligible to receive nominations.
 :  On day 72, the four eligible contestants competed in a special nomination challenge. Ana Paula and Rayanne won the challenge, therefore, Douglas and JP become this round's nominees by default.
 :  On day 73, the three eligible contestants competed in the final immunity challenge for place in the final. Douglas was the winner and became the second finalist of the season. Ana Paula and Rayanne were automatically nominated for the final eviction of the season.
 : For the final, the public votes for the contestant they want to win A Fazenda 8.

References

External links
 Official Site 

2015 Brazilian television seasons
A Fazenda